Mfon Ekpo  (born November 16, 1982) is a Nigerian entrepreneur and author. In 2017, Ekpo was named one of the most inspiring and influential women in Nigeria by Leading Ladies Africa and shortlisted for the British Council Alumni Awards for Social Impact in Nigeria. Ekpo serves as an Executive Director with The John Maxwell Team.

Early life and education 
Mfon holds multiple degrees in Public and International Law, Business law and Social sciences, Journalism, Neuro-linguistic Programming and has a master's degree in Maritime Law from the University of Southampton, England.

Career 
She has also served as the Executive Director of The Future Project, owners of the Future Awards, Africa's largest youth focused awards connecting young Africans to leadership, enterprise and governance. She took over from Chude Jideonwo, who was appointed Executive Director in 2010 and had functioned as Chief Executive of TFP and its parent organization, Red Media Africa. In 2014, she was selected as part of President Obama's Young African Leaders Initiative and was later appointed the Chair of the Advocacy Committee on the Regional Advisory Board for the Mandela Washington Fellowship. Mfon sits on the President's Advisory Council of the John Maxwell team and has conducted nationwide values-based transformational leadership initiatives on the invitation of governments in countries such as Guatemala and Paraguay.

Awards and recognition 
Mfon is also a multiple recipient of the ‘Golden Quill’ by the National Academy of Bestselling Authors in Hollywood for her bestselling books "Pushing to the Front" and "The only Business book you will ever need" which she co-authored with Brian Tracy, Robert Allen and Leigh Steinberg.

Mfon is a Mandela Washington Fellow in the pioneer set of President Obama's Young African Leaders Initiative, has served as the Chairperson of the Advocacy committee on the Regional Advisory Board for the Fellowship and was appointed a Goodwill Ambassador for the State of Arkansas in the United States of America in 2014 by the Governor of the State.

Public Talks 
Mfon is a frequent John Maxwell speaker and trainer. She has delivered talks at the SME-Support Clinic, on "Technology—The Fulcrum of New Age SMEs in Africa", as part of Social Media Week 2015 (SMWLagos).

Mfon Ekpo was a speaker at WIMBIZ's annual conference November 2015 themed 'Leadership Step Up & Stand Out!'.

References 

1982 births
Living people
People from Akwa Ibom State